Dr. Arcady P. Zhukov is a Russian professor.

Zhukov graduated in 1980 from the Moscow Steel and Alloys Institute (presently National University of Science and Technology), received Ph.D. degree from the Institute of Solid State Physics (Chernogolovka) of the Russian Academy of Science in 1988 and Doctor of Science (habilitation) from Moscow State “Lomonosov” University – in 2010. Presently -Ikerbasque Research professor at the Department of the Materials Physics of the University of Basque Country, Spain. He has published more than 450 referred papers in the international journals (total number of citations of A. Zhukov's papers, updated September 12, 2016: 5232, Citation H-index = 38). 

Zhukov chaired Donostia International Workshop on Energy, Materials, and Nanotechnology (DINEMN),  (San Sebastián, September 2015), International workshop on magnetic wires (IWMW-7) en Ordizia (Gipuzkoa, 2-3 Julio 2015), co-chaired  Donostia International Conference on Nanoscaled Magnetism (DICNMA), III Joint European Magnetic Symposia, organized and chaired few session of most important international conferences, gave above 50 invited talks at few international conferences. 

He is an associate Editor of IEEE Magnetic letters and International Journal on Smart Sensing and Intelligent Systems, member of several editorial boards and various committees of International Conferences, guest Editor of J. Magn. Magn. Mater, Phys. Stat. sol (A) and (C). A. Zhukov in collaboration with V. Zhukova wrote two books on magnetic properties and applications of glass-coated microwires, few book chapters (among them one for the Handbook of Magnetic Materials ed. by Prof. K. Buschow), articles for the “Enciclopedia of NanoScience and Nanotechnology” and  “Enciclopedia of  Sensors”. Additionally Dr. A. Zhukov is the Editor of two books,. 

In 2000 A. Zhukov funded a spin-off company “TAMAG” involved in magnetic microsensors development.
Most scientific activity is related to studies of magnetic properties of amorphous and nanocrystalline glass-coated microwires (typically of 1-30 micrometers in diameter) such as Giant Magnetoimpedance, GMI, effect and fast domain wall propagation.

References

Year of birth missing (living people)
Living people
Moscow State University alumni
National University of Science and Technology MISiS alumni
Russian physicists
Academic staff of the University of the Basque Country